The A27 autoroute is a toll free autoroute in northern France, approximately  long. It forms part of European route E42.

List of junctions

References

External links

 A27 Motorway on Saratlas

A27